Kvabliani is a river on the southern slope of the Meskheti Range, in the Khulo and Adigeni municipalities. It originates at 2355 m above sea level. Attached to the river Potskhovistskali from the left. Length 41 km, basin area 900 km. It feeds on snow, rain and groundwater. Floods are known in spring, waterlogging in summer and winter, and floods in autumn. 52% of annual runoff flows in spring, 16% in summer, 20% in autumn and 12% in winter. Frostbite, toss, drizzle, ice cover are common occurrences from November to March. The average annual flow at the confluence is 16.2 m3/ s. Used for irrigation.

See also
Adigeni

References

Rivers of Georgia (country)